Linn Tormodsdatter Grøndahl Sunne  (born 2 December 1971) is a Norwegian children's writer.

Sunne resides in Dokka. She made her literary debut in 2000. She was awarded the Brage Prize in 2007 for the children's book Happy. In 2012 she again received the Brage Prize, for the children's book Lille ekorn.

References

1971 births
Living people
People from Nordre Land
Norwegian children's writers